Code 3 may refer to:

 Code 3 Collectibles, a scale model company
 Code 3 Response, a response mode for emergency vehicles
 Code-3 temporal pattern, a distinct evacuation tone pattern used primarily in fire alarms
 Code 3 (TV series), 1957 TV series produced at Hal Roach Studios
 Code 3 in sailing: see spinnaker
 Code 3, a documentary TV series following firefighters, hosted by Gil Gerard